Wang Meng is a crater on Mercury. Its name was adopted by the International Astronomical Union (IAU) in 1976. The crater is named for the Chinese painter Wang Meng.

Wang Meng is one of 110 peak ring basins on Mercury.

Hollows are present within Wang Meng.

The crater Judah Ha-Levi is to the northwest of Wang Meng.  To the south is Chu Ta, to the southeast is Rajnis, and to the north is Chiang Kʽui.

References

Impact craters on Mercury